This is a list of drainage windmills in the current ceremonial county English county of Norfolk. Some of the windmills in this area receive maintenance from the Norfolk Windmills Trust.

Locations

A

B

C

D - F

G - H

I - L

M

N - O

P - R

S

T - W

Maps
 1749 Emanuel Bowen
 1765 Corbridge
 1775 Bowles
 1783 Joseph Hodgkinson
 1797 Faden
 1826 Bryant
 1834 Greenwood
 1837 Ordnance Survey
 1838 Ordnance Survey
 1884 Ordnance Survey

Notes
Mills in bold are still standing, known building dates are indicated in bold. Text in italics denotes indicates that the information is not confirmed, but is likely to be the case stated.

Sources

References

 
Windpumps in the United Kingdom
Lists of windmills in England
Drainage windmills